RACK may refer to:

 RACK, the former NASDAQ ticker symbol for Silicon Graphics International, formerly called Rackable Systems
 Risk-aware consensual kink
 RACK1, a protein of the eukaryotic 40S ribosomal subunit that binds protein kinase c

See also 
 Rack (disambiguation)
 Wrack (disambiguation)